P. Judson is an Indian Entomologist, who researched much on Dysdercus cingulatus in the 1970s.  In the successive decades, he took to teaching of Zoology at Osmania University, Secunderabad, a State-run University u/s 2 (f) of the University Grants Commission Act, 1956.  He contributed much to the discipline of Entomology through scholarly articles in scientific journals (see section on writings).  He was also a member of the Indian Society for Comparative Animal Physiology.

Judson was Lecturer, Reader, then Professor and Head and Chairperson of Board of Studies of Department of Zoology at Osmania University, Secunderabad.  Earlier in 1997, he became Principal of the University College of Science, Saifabad. During his tenure, a full-fledged vocational course in Dryland farming leading to B. Sc. (Dryland farming) was launched in 2001 with the cooperation of three external stakeholders, namely, International Crops Research Institute for the Semi-Arid Tropics (ICRISAT), Central Research Institute for Dryland Agriculture (CRIDA) and Acharya N. G. Ranga Agricultural University (ANGRAU).

Much like an Old Testament Scholar contributing to the German academic journal Zeitschrift für die Alttestamentliche Wissenschaft (ZAW), Judson and others, contributed a research article in 1978 to the Leipzig-based academic journal, Zeitschrift für mikroskopisch-anatomische Forschung.

Few co-authored Writings

Judson's articles co-authored with others appeared in major scientific journals.  One of Judson's research articles published in 1978 with B. Kishen Rao, S. S. Thakur and B. Juilus Divakar entitled The effects of a juvenile hormone analogue on the male reproductive organs of the red cotton bug, Dysdercus cingulatus (Heteroptera) appeared in the scientific journal Experientia (now Cellular and Molecular Life Sciences), which has been kept in more than 500 library holdings in universities and academies across the world.

He was much active among the academic fraternity in Hyderabad, India.  In 2007, he co-organized a National Conference on Biodiversity Conversation and Human Wellbeing, which was conducted jointly by the Department of Zoology (OU) and Sálim Ali Centre for Ornithology and Natural History.  In 2008, he co-edited a compendium titled Biodiversity Conservation and Human Well-Being.  In 2009, Judson convened a national symposium on the theme Implications of climate change on mosquito-borne diseases and its impact on public health at Sir Ronald Ross Institute of Parasitology.

His co-authored writings comprise,

Other initiatives
Judson is a communicant member of Samavesam of Telugu Baptist Churches (STBC) and attached to the STBC-Baptist Church, Lallaguda, Secunderabad.  He is also associated with Training in Evangelism Needs and Technology (TENT), a brain child of the Geologist, B. E. Vijayam, who set up such facility to promote means of livelihood with the inspiration being attributed to Bishop Bunyan Joseph of the Church of South India, a rural Evangelist, Canon (priest) and later Bishop.

Inter-faith dialogue
Judson was also involved in other initiatives relating to Interfaith dialogue and Community development.  He was on the Council of the Henry Martyn Institute, Shivarampally for over a decade.  Judson was on the Committee and later on the Council, which was led by Theologians comprising C. L. Furtado, P. Surya Prakash and others.  Judson came up on the Committee, especially at a crucial juncture, when the institute relocated to its new campus in Shivarampally from its earlier locality in Abids.

Community development
Judson is also on the Advisory Board of Genesis Urban and Rural Development under whose aegis a National Conference on emerging challenges and opportunities in Agriculture, Social, Plant, Environment, Cooperatives and Technology was held in 2016.

Efforts by the members of the STBC-Baptist Church, Lallaguda resulted in creation of a social action initiative which was named Burden and Love for Economically and Socially Suppressed (BLESS) in which Judson has been active and presently holds the position of Secretary.  Through the Church, he has been actively involved in promoting food security among those marginalized dry land farmers of Telangana through System of Rice Intensification in a few mandals of Yadadri Bhuvanagiri district and Medchal-Malkajgiri district.

During the 2010s, he took up social action initiatives in Andhra Pradesh, Telangana and Odisha through the Canadian Baptist Ministries in which he was a Field Staff and Team member.  Judson is the present India representative of European Baptist Mission International overseeing social action programmes together with 16 partners in the country.

See also

 Prof. Dr. M. Abel, Ph. D. (California),
 Prof. Dr. T. D. J. Nagabhushanam, Ph. D. (IARI),
 Prof. Dr. P. A. James, Ph. D. (Osmania)
 Dr. J. A. Oliver, Ph. D. (ANGRAU),
 Prof. Dr. B. E. Vijayam, Ph. D. (Osmania),

Further reading

References

Telugu people
Indian Christians
Indian zoologists
Indian entomologists
Andhra Pradesh academics
Scientists from Hyderabad, India
Indian scientists
Indian Baptists
Osmania University alumni
Living people
20th-century Indian zoologists
Canadian Baptist Ministries missionaries in India
1950 births